Guiscardo Suardi (died 22 Feb 1282) was a Roman Catholic prelate who served as Bishop of Bergamo (1272–1282).

Biography
On 8 Jul 1272, Guiscardo Suardi, member of the Suardi family, was appointed during the papacy of Pope Gregory X as Bishop of Bergamo.
He served as Bishop of Bergamo until his death on 22 Feb 1282.

While bishop, he was the principal consecrator of Berardo Maggi, Bishop of Brescia (1275).

References

External links and additional sources
 (for Chronology of Bishops)
 (for Chronology of Bishops)

13th-century Italian Roman Catholic bishops
Bishops appointed by Pope Gregory X
1282 deaths
Bishops of Bergamo